Stanisław Kłodziński (1918–1990) was a Polish physician, lung specialist, and survivor of the Auschwitz concentration camp.

Notes

1918 births
1990 deaths
Auschwitz concentration camp survivors
Polish pulmonologists